The Americas Zone was one of three zones of regional competition in the 2018 Fed Cup.

Group I 
 Venue: Club Internacional de Tenis, Asunción, Paraguay (clay)
 Date: 7–10 February

The seven teams were divided into two pools of three and four teams. The two pool winners took part in a play-off to determine the nation advancing to the World Group II play-offs. The two nations finishing last and second last in their pools took part in relegation play-offs, with the two losing nations being relegated to Group II for 2019. Puerto Rico withdrew before the tournament due to the economic circumstances caused by Hurricane Maria.

Seeding

 1Fed Cup Rankings as of 13 November 2017

Pools

Play-offs

Final placements 

  was promoted to the 2018 Fed Cup World Group II play-offs.

Group II 
 Venue 1: Club Deportivo La Asunción, Metepec, Mexico (hard) 
 Venue 2: Centro Nacional de Tenis de la FET, Guayaquil, Ecuador (clay)
 Dates: 20–23 June and 18–21 July

Seeding

 1Fed Cup Rankings as of 23 April 2018

Pools

Play-offs

Final placements 

References 

 Fed Cup Result, 2018 Americas Group I
 Fed Cup Result, 2018 Americas Group II

External links 
 Fed Cup website

 
Americas
Tennis tournaments in Ecuador
Tennis tournaments in Paraguay
Tennis tournaments in Mexico
Mex